National Democracy (ND), known colloquially as natdem, is a political ideology and movement in the Philippines that aims to establish a people's democracy in the country. With the Communist Party of the Philippines as the vanguard party, the movement seeks to address what it deems to be the "root causes of social injustices affecting the Filipino masses" in what is analyzed to be a "semi-colonial and semi-feudal society", by confronting the "three fundamental problems" of imperialism, feudalism, and "bureaucrat capitalism".

It is not to be confused with the existing democratic form of government in the country.

History and background
The national democratic movement has its origins in opposition to former president and dictator Ferdinand Marcos during the late 1960s and early 1970s, but in its entirety is interpreted by the ND as a continuation of struggles since the 1896 Philippine Revolution led by the Katipunan. As a result of sustained economic, political, and military abuses during the Marcos dictatorship, several figures such as Jose Maria Sison (writing under the eponym Amado Guerrero) proposed that the creation of a revolutionary mass movement of a national democratic character was necessary to overcome the "three basic problems" underpinning the oppressive conditions of Philippine society in the 1970s. Sison's vision uses Marxist–Leninist–Maoist principles for social analysis and in carrying out people's democracy or national democracy:

Once martial law was lifted in 1981 and Corazon Aquino was elected to the Presidency in 1986 after the People Power Revolution, corruption and abuse of government power remained endemic in the Philippine political system, which according to the ND were exemplified by the Mendiola massacre, the counter-insurgency programs waged against the armed groups of the Moro Islamic Liberation Front and the New People's Army, embezzlement and graft during the terms of Joseph Estrada and Gloria Macapagal Arroyo, and the 2004 Hacienda Luisita massacre. According to the analysis espoused since the 1970s by Sison and others, the continuation of human rights violations in the Philippines at the hands of government officials and other social, economic, and political injustices highlight the need of liberating the nation the imperialist forces—primarily led, from what ND proponents identifies, the United States. As a former U.S. colony, the Philippines' dynamic with the United States dates back to the Philippine–American War.

Organizations
The national democratic movement is divided into underground and legal groups. The National Democratic Front of the Philippines (NDFP) is the underground, revolutionary and subversive coalition of various national democratic groups that comprise organizations such as the Communist Party of the Philippines, New People's Army, and Kabataang Makabayan.

The legal groups are collectively known as national democratic mass organizations. Most of these groups participate in the country's national elections and are not part of the on-going armed struggle. The national democratic movement of the Philippines is also interwoven with a larger global alliance: the  International League of Peoples' Struggle (ILPS), in which Joma Sison serves as its founder and chairman emeritus.

References

 
Anti-imperialist organizations
Organizations with year of establishment missing
Political movements in the Philippines